Events from the year 1952 in art.

Events
 August 29 – Composer John Cage's 4′33″, during which the performer does not play, premieres in Woodstock, New York.
 Eight younger British artists (Robert Adams, Kenneth Armitage, Reg Butler, Lynn Chadwick, Geoffrey Clarke, Bernard Meadows, Eduardo Paolozzi and William Turnbull) are represented in the "New Aspects of British Sculpture" exhibition at the Venice Biennale which Herbert Read describes as the "Geometry of Fear". Britain also displays paintings by Graham Sutherland and Edward Wadsworth.
 Louis le Brocquy's 1951 painting A Family sparks controversy in Ireland when a group of art patrons offer to present it to the Dublin Municipal Gallery and it is rejected by the Art Advisory Committee on the grounds of incompetence.
 Henri Cartier-Bresson's photographic collection Images à la sauvette is published by Tériade in Paris.
 Publication of Un Art Autre, by Michel Tapié.

Awards
 Archibald Prize: William Dargie – Mr Essington Lewis, CH
 Prix Puvis de Chavannes – Tristan Klingsor

Works

 Michael Andrews – A Man who Suddenly Fell Over
 Francis Bacon
 Figure in a landscape
 Study for Crouching Nude
 Salvador Dalí – Galatea of the Spheres
 Dwight D. Eisenhower – Field Marshal Bernard Montgomery
 M. C. Escher
 Gravitation
 Puddle
 Helen Frankenthaler – Mountains and Sea
 Lucian Freud – Girl In Bed
 Elisabeth Frink – Bird
 Willem de Kooning – Woman I
 Henri Laurens – L'Amphion (sculpture, University City of Caracas)
 René Magritte – The Listening Room
 Henri Matisse – cutouts
 series of Blue Nudes, e.g., Blue Nude I, Blue Nude II
 Black Leaf on Green Background
 La Négresse
 The Sorrows of the King
 John Minton – The Death of Nelson
 Henry Moore – King and Queen (bronze)
 Jackson Pollock – Blue Poles
 Kay Sage – On the Contrary
 David Smith – Agricola I (sculpture)
 Dorothea Tanning – The Friend's Room
 Lovejoy Columns, Portland, Oregon, painted by Tom Stefopoulos

Exhibitions
 September 25 – November 9 – Jacob Epstein retrospective, Tate Gallery, London
 Exhibition of forgeries, Stedelijk Museum Amsterdam

Births
March 18 – Sally Robinson, English-born Australian painter
March 22 – Bernard Pras, French plastics technician
 May 23 – Martin Parr, English documentary colour photographer
 August 13 – Herb Ritts, American photographer (d. 2002)
 October 20 – Derek Ridgers, English portrait and street culture photographer
 November 15 – Blek le Rat (Xavier Prou), French stencil graffiti artist 
 November 22 – Corno (Joanne Corneau), Canadian post-pop painter (d. 2016)
 date unknown
 Graham Forsythe, Northern Irish/Canadian painter
 Duncan Hannah, American painter  (d. 2022)
 Mona Hatoum, Lebanese-born Palestinian multimedia artist
 James Little, American painter
 Daniel Meadows, English photographer
 Ian Rank-Broadley, English sculptor

Deaths
 March 3 – Howard Chandler Christy, American painter and illustrator (b. 1873)
 April 9 – Caroline Risque, American sculptor and painter (b. 1883)
 May 5 – Alberto Savinio, Italian writer and painter (b. 1891)
 June 9 – Alice Austen, American photographer (b. 1866)
 August 16 – Lydia Field Emmet, American painter (b. 1866)
 October 15 – Katharine Adams, English bookbinder (b. 1862)
 December 15 - Goscombe John, Welsh sculptor (b. 1860)
 date unknown:
 Arthur Beecher Carles, American Modernist painter (b. 1882)
 William Lee Hankey, English painter and illustrator (b. 1869)
 Nicolas Sursock, Lebanese art collector (b. 1875)

See also
 1952 in fine arts of the Soviet Union

References

 
Years of the 20th century in art
1950s in art